Brodniki is a rural locality (a village) in Oktyabrskoye Rural Settlement, Vyaznikovsky District, Vladimir Oblast, Russia. The population was 10 as of 2010.

Geography 
Brodniki is located on the Suvoroshch River, 16 km west of Vyazniki (the district's administrative centre) by road. Korshunikha is the nearest rural locality.

References 

Rural localities in Vyaznikovsky District